Douce violence is the third album of the French singer Elsa Lunghini, and it was released in 1992.

Background and critical reception

In this album, when she was only 19, she began to disassociate herself from his father, the composer Georges Lunghini. Understanding her phobias, he wrote songs including "Bouscule-moi" or "Tout l'temps, tout l'temps." There are also four songs written by Jean-Loup Dabadie.

This album met with less success than previous ones, although it was certified Gold, and marked the singer's change of look : indeed, she appeared more adult with a very short cut.

The singles from this album were less successful than the previous one : "Bouscule-moi" was the only one that reached the French Singles Chart, but it failed to enter the top ten (#14).

Track listing

Album credits

Personnel
Raymond Donnez - programming
Celmar Engel - synthesizer
Claude Salmiéri - drums
Roger Secco - drums
Denis Benarrosh - percussion
Bernard Paganotti - bass guitar
Jannick Top - bass guitar
Gérard Bikialo - piano
Michel-Yves Kochmann - guitar
Basile Leroux - guitar
Patrice Tison - guitar
Elsa - backing vocals

Production
Arranged by Raymond Donnez
Produced by Raymond Donnez & Georges Lunghini
Engineered by Didier Bader & Bruno Lambert
Mixed by Bruno Lambert at Studio Marcadet, Paris
Amoureuse, moi ? mixed by Andy Scott

Design
Jean-Daniel Lorieux - photography
★ Bronx - design

Charts, certifications and sales

Certifications and sales

References

1992 albums
Elsa Lunghini albums